Zoom may refer to:

Arts, entertainment and media

Film
 Zoom (2006 film), starring Tim Allen
 Zoom (2015 film), a Canada-Brazil film by Pedro Morelli
 Zoom (2016 Kannada film), a Kannada film
 Zoom (2016 Sinhala film), a Sri Lankan film

Music
 Zoom (dance music group), a Eurodance group formed in Denmark
 Zoom (The Knack album), 1998
 Zoom (Electric Light Orchestra album), 2001
 Zoom (Noah23 album), 2011
 Zoom (Rachid Taha album)
 Zoom, an album by Alvin Lee
 "Zoom" (Dr. Dre song), 1998
 "Zoom" (Fat Larry's Band song), 1982
 "Zoom" (Jessi song), 2022
 "Zoom" (Lil Boosie song), 2006
 "Zoom", a song by the Commodores from their self-titled album
 "Zoom", a song by Last Dinosaurs from the album In a Million Years
 "Zoom!", a song by Super Furry Animals from the album Love Kraft
 "Zoom", a song by Soda Stereo from the album Sueño Stereo
 "Zoom", a song by Tata Young from the album Temperature Rising
 Zoom In, a 2021 EP by Ringo Starr

Television
 Zoom  (1972 TV series),
 Zoom  (1999 TV series), a remake of the 1972 series
Zoom the White Dolphin, a 1971 Japanese–French anime series, of 13 episodes
 Zoom (Indian TV channel)
 Zoom (Israeli TV channel)
 Zoom (Ukrainian TV channel)

Other uses in arts, entertainment and media
 Zoom! (poetry book), a 1989 poetry collection by Simon Armitage, now Poet Laureate
 Zoom, commonly associated with variations of the Reverse-Flash, an enemy of the DC Comics character the Flash
 Zoom!, a computer game
 Zoom, a wordless children's picture book by Istvan Banyai
 Zoom Schwartz Profigliano, a drinking game often referred to as just "Zoom"

Businesses and organisations
 Zoomcar, a carsharing company in India
 Zoom (video game company), a Japanese video-game company
 Zoom Airlines Inc., a former Canadian airline
 Zoom Airlines Limited, its former British sister company
 Zoom Corporation, a Japanese audio company
 ZOOM Erlebniswelt Gelsenkirchen, a zoological park in Gelsenkirchen, Germany
 ZoomInfo (formerly Zoom Information), an American software company
 Zoom Systems, a manufacturer of automated retail kiosks
 Zoom Telephonics, a networking equipment manufacturer
 Zoom Video Communications, provider and developer of the Zoom videoconferencing app

Technology

Computing
 Zoom (software), videoconferencing application
 Page zooming, the ability to magnify or shrink a portion of a page on a computer display
 Zooming user interface, a graphical interface allowing for image scaling
 Digital zoom, an electronic emulation of a zoom lens

Optics
 Zoom ratio, the maximum relative to the minimum magnification factor of an optical system
 Zoom lens, a lens system with a variable focal length, and hence variable magnification and angle of view
 Zooming (filmmaking), a cinematographic effect
 Maxx Zoom, a camera system

Other uses
 Bergen op Zoom, a municipality in North Brabant, Netherlands
 Billy Zoom (born 1948), American guitarist and founding member of punk band X
 Zoom climb, in aviation
 Zooming (writing skill), especially used in descriptive writing
 ZooMS  (zooarchaeology by mass spectrometry), a scientific method that identifies animal species from a protein found in bone and antler

See also

 Xoom (disambiguation)
 Zoom TV (disambiguation)
 Zoom Zoom (disambiguation)
 "Rump Shaker" (song), a 1992 song by Wreckx-N-Effect that features the expression "Zooma-Zoom-Zoom-Zoom" in its chorus